Dutty Rock (West Indian patois for "dirty rock") is the second studio album by Jamaican reggae/dancehall artist Sean Paul. Released on 12 November 2002, it features four top 15 Billboard Hot 100 hits, "Gimme the Light", "Get Busy", "Like Glue" and "I'm Still in Love with You". It is also his first album to have a Parental Advisory sticker. The album debuted at number 26 on the US Billboard 200, selling 65,000 copies in its first week and went on to become an international phenomenon, eventually climbing the charts peaking at number 9 on the US Billbaord 200, number 2 on the UK Albums Chart and topping the Canadian Albums Chart. The song "Top of the Game" was featured in NBA Live 2004.

In September 2003, Sean Paul re-released the album in order to cater more to international markets. The re-released version replaced all the skits and the track "It's On" with the hit single "Baby Boy", a collaboration with Beyoncé that became one of the biggest hits of 2003, topping the Billboard Hot 100, spending nine weeks at number one. The album was certified double platinum by the Recording Industry Association of America (RIAA) and sold over 6 million copies worldwide by the end of 2003, helping Sean Paul become a Grammy Award-winning artist, earning Best Reggae Album in 2004.

Critical reception
The album was met with critical acclaim among both urban and mainstream outlets. Over the years, Dutty Rock has been recognized as Sean Paul's best album, which has also been credited with the mainstream breakthrough of dancehall music to a worldwide audience.< Tim Sendra of Allmusic gave the album 4 out of 5 stars, calling it "an infectious record, bursting with hooks and filled with energy." Robert Marriott of Q magazine also gave the album 4 stars out of 5, stating "like Supercat, his Daddy Cool predecessor in dancehall, Paul’s style translates well to hip-hop fans". Jay Soul of RapReviews rated the album a 9 out of 10 score, praising the sound of the album; "just a great listen, pretty much start to finish, and the replay value is high....The production values on 'Dutty Rock' are so outstandingly high, that when coupled with the ultra-melodic sing/rap style it guarantees success."

Track listing

Notes
  signifies an additional producer

Charts

Weekly charts

Year-end charts

Certifications

References

Sean Paul albums
2002 albums
Atlantic Records albums
VP Records albums
Albums produced by Scott Storch
Albums produced by the Neptunes
Grammy Award for Best Reggae Album